The 1903 Columbian Orange and Blue football team was an American football team that represented Columbian University (now known as George Washington University) as an independent during the 1903 college football season. In their first season under head coach David Houston, the team compiled a 2–5 record.

Schedule

References

Columbian University
George Washington Colonials football seasons
Columbian University football